"That's What Little Girls Are Made Of" is the debut mainstream single by American singer-actress Raven-Symoné featuring American rapper Missy Elliott (credited as her full name "Melissa Elliott"), taken from her debut studio album, Here's to New Dreams. This is Raven-Symoné's highest chart appearance to date.

The song was written and produced by Elliott, who performs a verse of scat singing and Jamaican-style toasting, but the music video featured a thinner light-skinned actress lip-syncing her part. On Behind the Music Elliott reveals that she was not informed of the video shoot and later told she "didn't quite fit the image that we were looking for" — later taking her revenge with an oversized garbage-bag costume in her groundbreaking 1997 video "The Rain (Supa Dupa Fly)." Despite the setback Elliott received by the music industry over not being in the video; Elliott and Symone have expressed on Twitter respect for each other which the latter expressed interest in another collaboration.

Track listing 
12"
"That's What Little Girls Are Made Of" — 3:15

Cassette
"That's What Little Girls Are Made Of"— 3:15

Vinyl, 12"
"That's What Little Girls Are Made Of" (Extended Dub Remix) — 5:25
"That's What Little Girls Are Made Of" (Bogle Mix) — 3:52
"That's What Little Girls Are Made Of" (Raggamuffin Dub Semi-Instrumental) — 3:56

CD Single, Vinyl, 12", Promo
"That's What Little Girls Are Made Of" (Album Version) — 5:25
"That's What Little Girls Are Made Of" (Album Dub Version) — 3:52
"That's What Little Girls Are Made Of" (Dub Remix Radio Edit) — 5:28
"That's What Little Girls Are Made Of" (Boogie Mix) — 3:52
"That's What Little Girls Are Made Of" (Extended Dub Instrumental) — 5:27
"That's What Little Girls Are Made Of" (Raggamuffin Dub Semi-instrumental) — 3:56

Weekly charts

References 

1993 debut singles
Raven-Symoné songs
Missy Elliott songs
Songs written by Missy Elliott
Songs based on children's songs
1992 songs
MCA Records singles